Non son degno di te is a 1965 Italian "musicarello" film directed by Ettore Maria Fizzarotti.

Cast
Gianni Morandi	as 	Gianni Traimonti
Laura Efrikian	as 	Carla Todisco
Gino Bramieri	as	Ginone Traimonti
Nino Taranto	as 	Antonio Todisco
Raffaele Pisu	as  	Raffaele
Stelvio Rosi	as	Giorgio Di Bassano
Dolores Palumbo	as	Santina De Micheli Todisco
Enrico Viarisio	as 	Enzo
Ave Ninchi	as	Cesira
Carlo Taranto 	as Sgt. Scannapietra
Dori Dorika as Miss Scannapietra
Fabrizio Capucci as	Luigi Addora
Vittorio Congia	as 	Nando Tazza
Dino Mele	as Ciccio Marletta
Lena von Martens	as	Lena
Aroldo Tieri	as	Funzionario TV

External links
 

1965 films
1960s Italian-language films
Films set in Naples
Films set in Rome
Musicarelli
Films scored by Ennio Morricone
Films directed by Ettore Maria Fizzarotti
1965 musical comedy films
1960s Italian films